Sullivan's Raid may refer to:

Battle of Staten Island (1777)
Sullivan Expedition (1779) in western New York state